Przymiarki may refer to the following places:
Przymiarki, Biłgoraj County in Lublin Voivodeship (east Poland)
Przymiarki, Tomaszów Lubelski County in Lublin Voivodeship (east Poland)
Przymiarki, Gmina Urszulin in Lublin Voivodeship (east Poland)
Przymiarki, Gmina Wola Uhruska in Lublin Voivodeship (east Poland)
Przymiarki, Świętokrzyskie Voivodeship (south-central Poland)
Przymiarki, Greater Poland Voivodeship (west-central Poland)
Przymiarki, Gmina Myślibórz in West Pomeranian Voivodeship (north-west Poland)
Przymiarki, Gmina Barlinek in West Pomeranian Voivodeship (north-west Poland)
Przymiarki, Świdwin County in West Pomeranian Voivodeship (north-west Poland)